"Fields of Gold" is a 1993 song by Sting.

Fields of Gold may also refer to:

Fields of Gold (novelette), a 2011 story by Rachel Swirsky
Fields of Gold: The Best of Sting 1984–1994, a compilation album by Sting.
Fields of Gold, a 1999 album by Terell Stafford
"Fields of Gold", a song by Finnish folk metal band Turisas in their album The Varangian Way (2007)
Turisas sings a live version on the documentary A Finnish Summer with Turisas (2008)
Fields of Gold, a 2002 television film directed by Bill Anderson
Fields of Gold, a book by Andy Stanley
Fields of Gold, a 2010 novel by Fiona McIntosh